Ilse D. Guggenberger (née de Caro, born 1 April 1942) is a Colombian chess master.

She was the Colombian Women's Champion in 1965, 1972, 1974, 1975, 1978, 1979, 1980, and 1984.

She played six times for Colombia in Chess Olympiads (1974, 1978, 1980, 1982, 1984, and 1988).

Guggenberger was awarded the Woman International Master (WIM) title in 1977.

References

External links
 

1942 births
Living people
Colombian female chess players
Chess Woman International Masters
20th-century Colombian women
21st-century Colombian women